This is a list of horror films released in the 1950s. At the beginning of the 1950s, horror films were described by Kim Newman as being "out of fashion". Among the most influential horror films of the 1950s was The Thing From Another World, with Newman stating that countless science fiction horror films of the 1950s would follow in its style, while a film made just the year before, The Man from Planet X was still in debt to Universal horror style of filming with a bearded scientist and foggy sets. For five years following the release of The Thing From Another World, nearly every film involving aliens, dinosaurs or radioactive mutants would be dealt with matter-of-fact characters as seen in The Thing From Another World. Even films that adapted for older characters had science fiction leanings such as The Vampire, The Werewolf and Frankenstein 1970 being influenced by the atomic inspired monsters of the era. Films with a Strange Case of Dr Jekyll and Mr Hyde theme also appeared with The Neanderthal Man, The Fly, Monster on the Campus and Hideous Sun Demon.

While studies suggest that gothic horror had fallen out of fashion between the release of House of Dracula and The Curse of Frankenstein, small glimpses of the genre appeared in films such as The Son of Dr. Jekyll, The Strange Door, The Black Castle and House of Wax. Several of these films were also shot in 3D such as The Mad Magician, Phantom of the Rue Morgue, and The Maze. Universal-International produced the film ''Cult of the Cobra which created a short lived wave of horror films featuring Pin-up model like mutants such as The Leech Woman and The Wasp Woman. Prior to the release of Hammer Film Productions's gothic films, the last gothic horror films of the 1950s often featured aged stars like Bela Lugosi, Lon Chaney Jr., and Boris Karloff in films made by low budget indie film directors like Ed Wood or Reginald LeBorg or producers like Howard W. Koch. Hammer originally began developing American-styled science fiction films in the early 1950s but later branched into horror with their colour films The Curse of Frankenstein and Dracula. These films would birth two horror film stars: Christopher Lee and Peter Cushing. Along with Hammer's more science fiction oriented series Quatermass, both the gothic and science fiction films of Hammer would develop many similar films within the years.

Horror films aimed a young audience featuring teenage monsters grew popular in the 1950s with several productions from American International Pictures (AIP) and productions of Herman Cohen with I Was a Teenage Werewolf and I Was a Teenage Frankenstein. This led to later productions like Daughter of Dr. Jekyll and Frankenstein's Daughter. Director William Castle also attracted horror audiences with his gimmick-themed horror films such as The Tingler and House on Haunted Hill. Horror films also expanded further into international productions in the 1950s such as Mexican production El vampiro. In Italy, Riccardo Freda and Mario Bava developed early Italian horror films with I Vampiri and Caltiki – The Immortal Monster. Productions also extended into the Philippines (Terror Is a Man), Germany (The Head and Horrors of Spider Island) and France (Eyes Without a Face).

List

See also
 Lists of horror films

References

Citations

Bibliography

 
 
 
 
 
 

1950s
Horror